Events from the year 1903 in France.

Incumbents
President: Émile Loubet
President of the Council of Ministers: Emile Combes

Events
10 August – Paris Métro train fire kills 84 people mostly at Couronnes station.

Sport
1 July – First Tour de France begins.
19 July – Tour de France ends, won by Maurice Garin.

Births

January to March
16 January – William Grover-Williams, motor racing driver and war hero.
13 February – Georges Simenon, writer (died 1989)
21 February
Anaïs Nin, writer (died 1977)
Raymond Queneau, poet and novelist (died 1976)
27 February – Fernand Gambiez, General and military historian (died 1989)
8 March – Jean d'Eaubonne, art director (died 1970)
9 March – André Godinat, cyclist (died 1979)

April to June
8 May – Fernandel, actor (died 1971)
15 May – Germaine Dieterlen, anthropologist (died 1999)
22 May – Yves Rocard, physicist (died 1992)
2 June – Max Aub, author, playwright and literary critic (died 1972)
18 June – Raymond Radiguet, author (died 1923)
25 June – Pierre Brossolette, journalist and Resistance fighter (died 1944)
28 June – André Maschinot, soccer player (died 1963)

July to September
25 July – André Fleury, composer, pianist and organist (died 1995)
15 August – Pascal Pia, writer, journalist, illustrator and scholar (died 1979)
19 August – Claude Dauphin, actor (died 1978)
29 August – Jean Follain, author, poet and lawyer (died 1971)

October to December
1 October – Pierre Veyron, motor racing driver (died 1970)
10 October – Ferdinand Le Drogo, cyclist (died 1976)
16 October – Cécile de Brunhoff, storyteller (died 2003)
19 October – Jean Delsarte, mathematician (died 1968)
24 October – Charlotte Perriand, architect and designer (died 1999)
1 November – Jean Tardieu, artist, musician, poet and author (died 1995)
3 November – Charles Rigoulot, weightlifter, professional wrestler, race car driver and actor (died 1962)
9 November – Léon-Étienne Duval, Cardinal (died 1996)
15 November – Lucien Rebatet, author, journalist and intellectual (died 1972)
27 November – Julien Moineau, cyclist (died 1980)
30 November – Claude Arrieu, composer (died 1990)
17 December – Roland de Vaux, priest and archaeologist (died 1971)
23 December – Armand Blanchonnet, cyclist and Olympic gold medallist (died 1968)

Full date unknown
Maryse Choisy, philosophical writer (died 1979)
Pierre Naville, writer and sociologist (died 1993)

Deaths
28 January
Augusta Holmès, composer (born 1847)
Robert Planquette, composer of songs and operettas (born 1848)
5 March – Gaston Paris, writer and scholar (born 1839)
14 March – Ernest Legouvé, dramatist (born 1807)
28 March – Émile Baudot, telegraph engineer (born 1845)
8 May – Paul Gauguin, painter (born 1848)
16 May – Sibyl Sanderson, American operatic soprano (born 1864 in the United States)
13 November – Camille Pissarro, painter (born 1830)

Full date unknown
Jean-Jules Allasseur, sculptor (born 1818)
Louis-Arsène Delaunay, actor (born 1826)

See also
 List of French films before 1910

References

1900s in France